César Canchila (born 15 March 1982) is a Colombian former professional boxer who competed from 2001 to 2014. He held the interim WBA light flyweight title from 2008 to 2009. At the regional level, he held the WBO Latino and WBA Fedelatin light flyweight titles.

Professional career
Canchila was born in the small town of Cereté on 15 March 1982 and currently resides in Montería. On July 26, 2008 he captured the vacant WBA Interim Light Flyweight Title when he won a unanimous decision against the previously unbeaten Giovanni Segura in Las Vegas. Canchila would then lose the title in a rematch to Segura in his very next bout by 4th round TKO on March 14, 2009.

In 2009 he took on the then unbeaten Filipino boxer Johnriel Casimero for the WBO's interim version of the light flyweight title. As with the second Segura bout Canchila lost this fight by TKO, this time in the 11th round.

He is managed by Colombian promoter Billy Chams and trained by Cartagena-born Orlando Pineda.

References

External links 
 

1982 births
Living people
Colombian male boxers
Light-flyweight boxers
People from Córdoba Department
21st-century Colombian people